"Ain't That Good News", also known as "Good News", is a song written and performed by soul singer Sam Cooke, released on RCA Records in 1964. The song was recorded in three takes for the 1964 album of the same name and reached number eleven on the pop chart, and number one on the Cashbox Magazine's R&B charts as a single.  Cooke performed the song live on American Bandstand on April 4 of the same year. It is a modern adaptation of an older gospel song of the same title.

Music 
The song was the first piece of new material that Cooke had recorded in the six months following the drowning death of his 18-month-old son Vincent. After reaching a new deal with RCA Records, Sam Cooke received more creative freedom in his work and had chosen a fine line of session musicians to accompany him.
Known for his gospel roots, Sam Cooke often used church influences in his music. "Ain't That Good News" is a secular reworking of an old spiritual. The spiritual's lyrics proclaimed the singer's faith and love for Jesus, built around gospel themes and a slow gospel tempo with an underlying pulsating drive. Sam Cooke, however, transformed the song into an uptempo soulful number with an upbeat horn and rhythm section. Cooke's version has the same feel, passion, and soul as the original, but is about the faith and love of a woman.

Reception
Cash Box said that Cooke "lashes out with expected polish and vigor on this happy-sounding affair" and said that the song "has that top ten sound."

Personnel
Credits for the song adapted from album liner notes.

 Sam Cooke - vocals

Horn Section
 John Ewing - trombone
 Jewell Grant - saxophone
 William Green - saxophone
 Edgar Redmond - saxophone
Rhythm Section
 Joseph Gibbons - guitar, banjo
 Edward Hall - drums, percussion
 René Hall - guitar
 Howard Roberts - guitar
 John Pisano - guitar
 Emil Radocchia - marimba, tympani, percussion
 Clifton White - guitar
 Eddie Tilman - bass

Cover Versions
Cooke's version was later covered by many acts, such as:
Otis Rush
The Supremes (led by Florence Ballard), 
David Fathead Newman
King Curtis
Ian Moss

References

External links 
Song profile at SongsOfSamCooke.com

Sam Cooke songs
1964 singles
Songs written by Sam Cooke
1964 songs
RCA Records singles
Song recordings produced by Hugo & Luigi
The Supremes songs